Exotherm may refer to:
Cold-blooded organism
Exothermic process